"Fall Out" is the 17th and final episode of the allegorical British science fiction series The Prisoner. It was written and directed by Patrick McGoohan who also portrayed the incarcerated Number Six. The episode was first broadcast in the UK on ITV (Scottish Television) on Thursday 1 February 1968 (it appeared on ATV Midlands and Grampian the day after) and first aired in the United States on CBS on 21 September 1968.

The episode omits the usual long opening sequence in favour of a recap of the penultimate episode, "Once Upon a Time". It is the only episode in the series in which the show's principal outdoors location, Portmeirion, is given a specific credit in the opening titles. This resulted from an agreement with Portmeirion's architect, Sir Clough Williams-Ellis, that the location would not be revealed until the series finale.

Plot summary
After besting Number Two at a battle of wills in "Once Upon a Time" at the apparent cost of Number Two's life, Number Six requests he be taken to see Number One. He is taken by The Supervisor to a large cavernous chamber that includes a British assembly hall with a number of masked delegates, whom the Supervisor joins, and a large metallic cylinder with a mechanical eye, labelled "1". Number Six is shown to his seat, a large ornate throne, to watch the proceedings.

A master of ceremonies ("the President") announces Number Six has passed the "ultimate test" and won the "right to be individual", but there are matters of ceremony involved in the "transfer of ultimate power". The caged room where Number Two died is brought to the chamber with his body still in it; medical personnel recover the body, resuscitate him, and give Two a make-over. Number Two, along with Number Forty-eight—a young modishly-dressed man—are presented as two different examples of "revolt" to the assembly. Number Forty-eight refuses to cooperate and drives the assembly to sing a rendition of "Dem Bones" before he is restrained. Number Two reveals he too was abducted to the Village and spits at the mechanical eye in defiance. Both men are taken away.

The President then presents Number Six as a third form of revolt, but as "a revolutionary of a different calibre" to be treated with respect. Number Six is shown his home in London is being prepared for his return, and he is presented with a million in traveller's cheques, petty cash, a passport, and the keys to his home and car. The President says Number Six is free to go home or go wherever he wants, but requests that Number Six stay and lead them as his behaviour has been so exemplary. The President then asks Number Six to address the assembly, but as he begins each sentence with "I" the assembly drowns him out with shouts of "Aye! Aye! Aye!..." 

Number Six is shown into the metallic cylinder. He passes transparent tubes holding Numbers Two and Forty-eight along with a third, empty tube, each labelled as "Orbit". Climbing a stairway, he finds a robed man in a mask watching surveillance videos of Number Six. Number Six pulls off the mask to find a gorilla mask underneath, and then under that, a man seemingly identical to Number Six. The robed figure escapes into a hatch above. Number Six locks the hatch and recognises the cylinder is a rocket like the one in "The Girl Who Was Death". He initiates its countdown, sending the President and Assembly into a panic, and an evacuation of the Village is ordered.

Number Six frees Numbers Two and Forty-eight, and along with the Butler, they gun down armed guards, making their way to the caged room which is revealed to be on the bed of a Scammell Highwayman low loader. They drive away from the Village as the rocket launches from the abandoned Village. Rover (the security of the Village) deflates and is destroyed (to the accompaniment of "I, Yi, Yi, Yi, Yi (I Like You Very Much)") upon exposure to the flames of the rocket's exhaust.

The four drive towards London. Nearing the city, Number Forty-eight alights and proceeds to hitch-hike. Just outside the Palace of Westminster, the truck is stopped by the police. The three abandon it and leave their separate ways. Number Two enters the Palace by the Peers' Entrance, while the Butler escorts Number Six back to his home, where his Lotus 7 car waits. Number Six sets off in his car, while the Butler enters Number Six's home, its door opening in the same manner as the automatic doors in the Village. The episode ends with the thunder claps from the series' opening sequence, as well as with the opening shot of Number Six driving on an open country road.

Cast
 Number Six - Patrick McGoohan
 Number Two - Leo McKern  
 Number Forty-Eight - Alexis Kanner
 President - Kenneth Griffith 
 Supervisor - Peter Swanwick 
 The Butler - Angelo Muscat
 Delegate - Michael Miller

Themes

Self imprisonment

The allegorical shift that takes place once the identity of Number One is revealed has been subjected to various interpretations. McGoohan himself commented that it means to say that "Each man is a prisoner unto himself". The episode's ending, with Six's flat door opening automatically, as in the Village, suggests that he is still not free. The final scene, being the same as the first scene of the series, implies that the series is a cycle that is about to repeat itself, supporting the idea that Six cannot be free from captivity. McGoohan commented on the final scene that it is meant to show that "freedom is a myth," and there is no final conclusion to the series because "we continue to be prisoners".

Production

Writing

Lead star and series creator Patrick McGoohan wrote and directed the episode. As ITC managing director Lew Grade said in the 1984 documentary Six into One: The Prisoner File, McGoohan, despite having promised earlier that he would conceive an ending for the series, came to him admitting that he was unable to come up with an ending. The biggest problem was revealing the identity of Number One, which, as McGoohan and various other crew members admitted, had not been decided on prior to the writing of the final episode's script.
  
According to the book The Prisoner by Robert Fairclough, McGoohan was informed that production was cancelled on the series immediately following filming of the preceding episode to be produced, "The Girl Who Was Death", and was given only a week to write a finale to conclude the storyline started in "Once Upon a Time", which had been filmed a year earlier. Fairclough's account is, however, in contradiction to virtually all others, which state that McGoohan knew when he left for America to act in the Hollywood film, Ice Station Zebra, that there would be only four more episodes produced from that point, starting with "Do Not Forsake Me Oh My Darling" during his absence and ending with a finale; indeed, most agree that this last happened because a scheduled production break was scrapped when two series of 13 episodes were reduced to one of seventeen due to ITC chief Lew Grade deciding that the actor/producer was taking too long and spending too much money.

In order to save time and cut costs, "Fall Out" reused several sets from "Girl", most notably the rocket control room. Two guest actors from the episode, Kenneth Griffith and Alexis Kanner, were also recruited to play different characters in "Fall Out". This was, in fact, Kanner's third appearance on the series in only a few weeks; he had previously played Number Eight alias "The Kid/Number 8" in the Western themed episode "Living in Harmony" as well as his uncredited role of the Photographer in "Girl". According to both Fairclough and Kenneth Griffith himself, McGoohan was so pressed for time that the actor was asked to write his own dialogue. While Leo McKern's Number Two is the same character that previously appeared, Kanner's Number 48 is almost certainly a different character from those he played in "Living in Harmony" (where his character in fact dies) and "The Girl Who Was Death", but it is unclear whether Griffith's character is the same one that was the Number Two in the latter episode. It was, however, not unusual in The Prisoner for actors to play different characters in different episodes.

McGoohan receives no onscreen acting credit in this episode. The episode opens with the series title superimposed over the first moments of the "Once Upon a Time" recap, with the location credit, episode title, guest stars, David Tomblin's producer credit and McGoohan's "written and directed by" credit over aerial footage of Portmeirion following that sequence. At the end, after the names of Kanner, McKern, and Muscat appear as captions over the actors themselves (still in character), an extreme aerial shot of the Lotus on London streets (the driver is not actually recognisable) is captioned simply, "Prisoner". Nor does McGoohan receive his usual executive producer credit; in "The Girl Who Was Death" it is replaced with a large "Patrick McGoohan as The Prisoner" credit, but here his name appears onscreen only as writer/director.

Other notes
Leo McKern's hair is trimmed much shorter in this final episode than in "Once Upon a Time" (and his beard is absent entirely) because he changed his appearance during the year-long production gap between filming the two episodes. The show accommodated this by showing McKern's face covered in shaving cream and being shaved before he is revived, though the reason for this is not made clear on screen (though some of Number Two's first words after revival are "I feel a new man!").
This is the only episode to feature a modern pop song. As Number Six approaches the large "court" chamber and again during the climactic gun battle, The Beatles' current hit "All You Need Is Love" (1967) is played in the background. Subsequent home video releases of the episode retain the Beatles recording, even though use of Beatles recordings in other series (most notably DVD releases of the Doctor Who story lines The Chase (1965) and Remembrance of the Daleks (1988) and CD releases of the soundtrack of the otherwise wiped The Evil of the Daleks, 1967) have required the Beatles music be edited out for VHS and DVD release. Two other pop song recordings are featured in the soundtrack: "I, Yi, Yi, Yi, Yi (I Like You Very Much)" by Carmen Miranda and the spiritual "Dem Bones" as recorded by The Four Lads, which at one point in the episode is lip-synched by Alexis Kanner.
McGoohan has very little dialogue in this final episode, save for brief exchanges with the Judge and Number 48, his unintelligible speech at the podium (only the words "I feel, that despite..." can be heard, the rest being drowned out by the "jury"), and a few slogans heard in the archive footage. After being shouted down by the jury in unison, while the Judge gazes implacably and solemnly at Number 6, No. 6 is not shown speaking again for the remainder of the episode.
The jukeboxes featured in the alcoves of the cave as Number Six is led to the courtroom are a Seeburg LPC480, Seeburg Mustang Discothèque, Seeburg SS160 Stereo Showcase, and a Wurlitzer 2300.
With Rover destroyed, the final shot of the closing credits remains on the completed graphic of the penny-farthing bicycle.

Broadcast
The broadcast date of the episode varied in different ITV regions of the UK. The episode was first shown on Scottish Television on Thursday 1 February 1968, on Friday 2 February on ATV Midlands and Grampian Television, on Sunday 4 February on ATV London, whose broadcasts were also taken up by Southern Television, Westward Television and Tyne-Tees; on Friday 9 February on Border Television, on Saturday 10 February on Anglia Television and on Friday 1 March on Granada Television in the North West. The aggregate viewing figures for the ITV regions that debuted the season in 1967 have been estimated at 9.8 million. In Northern Ireland, the episode did not debut until Saturday 13 April 1968, and in Wales, the episode was not broadcast until Wednesday 15 April 1970.

Reception

At the time "Fall Out" was first broadcast, there were only three television channels available in the UK and it was claimed that the long-awaited final episode of the series had one of the largest ever viewing audiences yet seen. However, this seems unlikely given that, like other ITC programmes, the show was screened in the various ITV regions at varying times on varying days; it was not networked. As home video was unavailable at the time, some viewers missed the fleeting glimpse of Number One's face, which was only four seconds long.

The finale intentionally avoided answering any mysteries regarding the origins of the Village, its intentions for Number Six and his reasons for resigning; there is also no clear explanation for why the Village releases Number Six. The episode depicts Numbers Six, Two, 48 and the Butler shooting their way out of the Village; this is in stark contradiction to the previously established absence of weapons in the Village and its impenetrable security. The Village's proximity to London in the finale is also unexplained. This resulted in bafflement and anger among the show's viewership to such an extent that McGoohan had to leave the country and go "into hiding" for a few days as dissatisfied viewers stormed his house.

Despite this, McGoohan stated in a 1977 interview that he was "delighted" with the reaction, as his intention was to create controversy. He explained that his enjoyment with the outrage was in line with the show's message, "as long as people feel something, that's the great thing, it's when they're walking around not thinking, not feeling, that's though, that's where all the dangerous stuff is, cause when you get a mob like that, you can turn them in to the sort of gang that Hitler had". The popular press joined in with the public indignation at this "rubbish" McGoohan had foisted on them. Although it is sometimes claimed that McGoohan never worked in the UK again after this, this is untrue as, for example, he starred in the Channel 4 production The Best of Friends (1991), and also appeared in the film Mary, Queen of Scots (1971), which was partially filmed in the UK. He did, however, tend to work in American television thereafter, including a Prisoner-tinged appearance on Columbo a few years later.

In 2001, TV Guide listed "Fall Out" as the 55th Greatest TV Episode of All Time.

Sequels in other media 
There have been two licensed sequels to this episode in other media, plus one that is implied to follow on from its story.
The Prisoner: I Am Not a Number, a 1969 novel by Thomas Disch, is set after this episode and has Number Six living in London with the Butler as his servant, but Number Six's memories of the Village have been erased. The novel suggests that this episode was a hallucination during the memory erasure process. The amnesia itself is a Village plot to manipulate Six into regaining his memories and inadvertently reveal secrets he would otherwise guard. However, Disch's novel additionally suggests that the Village may be a dream, a state of consciousness, a set of false memories or a virtual reality simulation. It is left to the reader to wonder which of these theories may be true.
The 1988 comic book sequel, Shattered Visage, declares that this episode was a drug-induced psychodrama in which Number Two staged his own death and resurrection, and that the onscreen images are part of the Degree Absolute process that began in the previous episode, "Once Upon a Time". It offers two contradictory accounts, however: Number Two claims that in this episode, "The man that would not bend simply broke. Shattered and alone, he chose a number and christened himself Number One. He had accepted. He was ours, body and soul. We had won!" In contrast, a British intelligence officer reviewing the Village files reports, "Number Six made several attempts to escape. The administration, in turn, interrogated him repeatedly. And, as far as I can tell, he did not talk."
A 2018 comic book miniseries, The Prisoner: The Uncertainty Machine (Titan Comics) does not feature Number 6 (despite images of Patrick McGoohan from the series used on the covers of each issue), but is set in the present day in the same continuity of the TV series and as such is implied to take place after the events of "Fall Out".

References

Sources
  – script of episode

External links

The Fall Out Theory
Articles and views on the episode

The Prisoner episodes
British television series finales
1968 British television episodes
Television courtroom dramas

fr:Le Dénouement (Le Prisonnier)